Eleanor Claire Reeves (born 11 December 1980) is a British politician who has served as Member of Parliament (MP) for Lewisham West and Penge since 2017. A member of the Labour Party, she was Shadow Solicitor General for England and Wales from April 2020 to December 2021. She has been Shadow Minister for Prisons and Probation since 2021.

Early life and career
Ellie Reeves was born in Lewisham, the daughter of teachers, Graham and Sally Reeves, and the sister of fellow Labour MP, Rachel Reeves.

Reeves grew up in Sydenham and was educated at Adamsrill Primary School and Cator Park Secondary School. She has a bachelor's degree in law from St Catherine's College, Oxford.

Before entering Parliament, Reeves worked as an employment law barrister representing trade unions.

Political career
Reeves joined the Labour Party at 15, chaired the Oxford University Labour Club in 2001 and was National Chair of Labour Students from 2002 to 2003.

In 2006, she was first elected as a constituency party representative on Labour's National Executive Committee (NEC), supported by Progress and Labour First. Reeves was returned to the governing body in subsequent elections, and served as Vice-Chair from 2015 to 2016, until she was defeated by Momentum in 2016. She later served as vice-chair of the London Labour Party.

Reeves was selected as the Labour candidate for Lewisham West and Penge in April 2017, chosen over left-wing Momentum activists.

Parliamentary career
Reeves was elected for the Labour-held seat of Lewisham West and Penge at the 2017 general election, almost doubling the party's majority.

She was appointed to the opposition front bench as Parliamentary Private Secretary to Kate Osamor, Shadow International Development Secretary, in March 2018. On 13 June 2018, Reeves and five other MPs resigned as frontbenchers to vote in favour of remaining in the single market, defying the party whip.

After signing a letter criticising the decision to re-admit Chris Williamson into Labour, a heavily pregnant Reeves was threatened with deselection by a party member in July 2019. Following backlash, Party Leader Jeremy Corbyn wrote that pregnant MPs wouldn't face deselection and the member withdrew their plans to challenge her.

On 9 April 2020, Reeves was re-appointed to the opposition front bench as Shadow Solicitor General for England and Wales.

She served as Labour's political lead for the 2021 Old Bexley and Sidcup by-election, in which there was a 7.4% increase in the party's vote share and 10.2% swing from the Conservatives to Labour, however the Conservatives held the seat with a 20.6% majority.

Personal life
She is married to John Cryer MP, Parliamentary Labour Party Chair. She had a son with Cryer in 2015, and another in late 2019.

References

External links

|-

1980 births
Living people
Labour Party (UK) MPs for English constituencies
UK MPs 2017–2019
UK MPs 2019–present
British women lawyers
Female members of the Parliament of the United Kingdom for English constituencies
Labour lawyers
People from Lewisham
21st-century British lawyers
21st-century British women politicians
Alumni of University College, Oxford
21st-century women lawyers
21st-century English women
21st-century English people
Spouses of British politicians